The Gwiriko Kingdom (Dyula: Masaya Gwiriko), also known as Gouiriko was a kingdom in the 18th and 19th centuries in what is now part of present-day Burkina Faso around the watershed of the River Banifin. It was founded by Famagah Ouattara (Wattara) and lasted until French occupation in 1897. Its chief city was Bobo-Dioulasso.

History
In the early 18th century, Sékou Ouattara took control of the city of Kong and expanded his influence, creating the Kong Empire. In about 1714, Seku's brother, Famagah Ouattara, established the Kingdom of Gwiriko, likely ruling as a representative of Seku, although possibly independently. At Seku's death around 1740, Ouattara's brother, Famagah Ouattara, refused to pay allegiance to Sekou Ouattara's sons and seized the area which included Tiefo, Dafin, and Bwamu. He allied with the Bobo-Juula, and established a state. He was succeeded within a few years by Kere Massa Ouattara and Magan Oule Ouattara, who faced repeated revolts which were put down by violent repression.

After the succeeding leader, Diori Ouattara, died in 1839, the state collapsed, and Tiefo, Bobo Joola, Bolon, and other regions became independent. Guimbe Ouattara (c 1836–1919), daughter of Diori Ouattara, was a noted leader in campaigns against the Kenedougou and against Noumoudara in this era. Bako Moru stemmed the collapse by allying with Tiéfo and Bobo Joola. In the ensuing battles, Tieba Traoré, future king of Kénédougou Kingdom, was captured and later sold as a slave.

During the reign of Ali Dyan (1854–1878) and his successor Kokoro Dyan, the central state lost control of the state and groups such as the Tyefo took control of the land. By the late 1800s, Gwiriko was pressed on many sides and in 1897, Pintieba Ouattara was installed to replace Tieba Ouattara by the French when Pintieba made a deal with French commandant Paul Caudrelier. Thereafter, the influence of the state quickly waned and while Pintieba and his successor Karamoko Ouattara held the title of King until 1915, by that time the state no longer existed.

Historiography
"Gwiriko" means "at the end of the long stage" in the Dyula language. The early history of this kingdom is recorded in the Ghunja Chronicle (Kitab al-Ghunja).

List of rulers

See also
Mossi states

References

Former monarchies of Africa
Countries in precolonial Africa
States and territories established in 1710
1897 disestablishments
History of Burkina Faso
1714 establishments in Africa